Park Sung-woo, Park Seong-woo or Park Seong-u may refer to:
 Park Sung-woo (badminton) (born 1971), South Korean badminton player
 Park Sung-woo (artist) (born 1972), South Korean manhwa artist
 Park Sung-woo (actor) (born 1988), South Korean actor